Ignacewo  is a settlement in the administrative district of Gmina Kościan, within Kościan County, Greater Poland Voivodeship, in west-central Poland.

The settlement has a population of 30.

References

Villages in Kościan County